Mansinh Patel is an Indian politician from Gujarat. He served as a member of the Gujarat Legislative Assembly from
1995 to 1999 and was elected as the Bharatiya Janata Party member of the Lok Sabha for Mandvi constituency in 1999. He had earlier served as deputy speaker of the Gujarat Legislative Assembly.
Father's Name	 Shri Kalyanji
Mother's Name	 Smt. Nani Bahan
Date of Birth	 02.06.1954
Place of Birth	 Vanskui, Tal. Mahuwa, Surat district, Gujarat
Marital Status	 Married
Date of Marriage	 14 May 1985
Spouse's Name	 Smt. Sunita Patel
No. of Sons	 2
Educational Qualifications	 B. Com. 
Educated at S.B. Garda College, Navsari, South Gujarat University, Surat (Gujarat)
Profession	 Agriculturist 
Social Worker
Permanent Address	
Vill & P.O. Mahuwa,
Surat district, Gujarat
(02625)55743, 55681,
FAX: (02625) 56837
Position Held
Pramukh, Taluka Panchayat, Mahuwa
1995	 Member, Gujarat Legislative Assembly
Deputy Speaker, Gujarat Legislative Assembly
1999	 Elected to 13th Lok Sabha
1999-2000	 Member, Committee on Food, Civil Supplies and Public Distribution
2000 -2004	 Member, Consultative Committee, Ministry of Rural Development
Special Interests
Discussions, reading, viewing natural scenery and social reforms
Sports and Clubs
Kabaddi, Kho-Kho and Volleyball.

References

Living people
India MPs 1999–2004
Lok Sabha members from Gujarat
People from Surat
Deputy Speakers of the Gujarat Legislative Assembly
1954 births
Gujarat MLAs 1995–1998
Bharatiya Janata Party politicians from Gujarat